Eurynotia is a weevil genus in the tribe Tropiphorini.

References 

 Broun, T. 1880: Manual of the New Zealand Coleoptera. Colonial Museum and Geological Survey Department, Wellington.
 Kuschel, G. 1969: The genus Catoptes Schönherr and two species oblitae of Fabricius from New Zealand (Coleoptera Curculionidae). New Zealand journal of science, 12: 789–810.
 May, B.M. 1977: Immature stages of Curculionidae: larvae of the soil-dwelling weevils of New Zealand. Journal of the Royal Society of New Zealand, 7(2): 189–228.

External links 

Entiminae